Jill-Lyn Euto (March 20, 1982 – January 28, 2001) was an eighteen-year-old American youth from Syracuse, New York, who was found murdered on January 28, 2001. Her mother found her stabbed to death in her apartment. Euto's murder remains unsolved.

Biography
Euto was studying to be a paramedic while working at clothing store Aeropostale in Shopping Town Mall.

Murder
Euto had previously made plans to watch the Super Bowl with her mother and sister on January 28, 2001. When Euto did not show up, her mother, Joanne Browning, called her phone and received no answer. On January 29, Browning called Euto's work and was told that she had not shown up for a scheduled shift.

With her fear for her daughter heightened, Browning went to Euto's sixth-floor apartment at 600 James Street in Syracuse, New York. Joanne found Euto's body and informed the police.

Investigators have stated that the murder occurred between noon and 3 pm on January 28. No locks were broken and no money was taken. Based on eyewitness reports, whoever killed her did not come into the building with her. The murder weapon was one of Euto's own kitchen knives.

Investigation and aftermath
To date, police have not publicly identified any suspects. Following the murder, Joanne Browning appeared on national television on shows such as The Sally Jessy Raphael Show, The Montel Williams Show, and the case has been profiled on America's Most Wanted.

In 2006, Browning filed a lawsuit against the property owner of the apartment. The complaint alleged that the property owners failed to "take minimal precautions to protect decedent from foreseeable harm from the criminal conduct of a third party." The case was dismissed due to lack of proof of negligence on behalf of the property owner.

An annual candlelight vigil for Euto took place from 2001 to 2007 to remember her and raise awareness.

See also
List of unsolved murders

References

External links
justice4jill-lyn Website
Syracuse Police Cold Case Site

2001 deaths
2001 in New York (state)
2001 murders in the United States
American murder victims
Deaths by stabbing in New York (state)
Deaths by person in New York (state)
Female murder victims
January 2001 events in the United States
People murdered in New York (state)
Unsolved murders in the United States
History of Syracuse, New York
Violence against women in the United States
History of women in New York (state)